Berchan may refer to:
 Briceni, city in Moldova
 Berchán, legendary Irish saint